Cacozelia neotropica is a species of snout moth in the genus Cacozelia. It was described by Hans Georg Amsel in 1956 and is known from Venezuela.

References

Epipaschiinae
Moths described in 1956